This article details the 2013 Santosh Trophy qualifiers.

Format
The qualifiers will start from 1 February to 19 February 2013 and will consist of 27 teams.

Qualification round 1

Group A

Group B

Group C

Group D

Qualification round 2

Group A

Group B

Group C

Group D

References

2012–13 Santosh Trophy